Complete filmography of Pakistani actor Mohammad Ali

Filmography

References

Pakistani filmographies